Catocala relicta, the white underwing or relict, is a moth of the family Erebidae. The species was first described by Francis Walker in 1858. It lives in southern Canada, from Newfoundland to Vancouver Island, south to Missouri, and Arizona.

The wingspan is 67–75 mm. Adults are on wing from July to September in one generation depending on the location.

The larvae feed on Betula papyrifera, Carya ovata, Populus alba, Populus balsamifera, Populus deltoides, Populus nigra, Populus tremuloides, Quercus species, and Salix species (including Salix eriocephala).

Subspecies
Catocala relicta elda, recorded from Oregon, was formerly considered a subspecies, but is now thought to be a synonym of Catocala relicta.

References

External links

Oehlke, Bill. "Catocala relicta Walker, [1858]". The Catocala Website. Archived December 27, 2008.

relicta
Moths of North America
Moths described in 1858